"Vogue" is a song by American singer Madonna from her second soundtrack album, I'm Breathless (1990). It was released as the first single from the album on March 27, 1990, by Sire Records. Madonna was inspired by vogue dancers and choreographers Jose Gutierez Xtravaganza and Luis Xtravaganza from the Harlem "House Ball" community, the origin of the dance form, and they introduced "vogueing" to her at the Sound Factory club in New York City. "Vogue" is a house song which set trends in dance music in the 1990s with strong influences of 1970s disco within its composition. "Vogue" also contains a spoken section, in which Madonna name-checks various "Golden Age" Hollywood stars. Lyrically, the song is about enjoying oneself on the dance floor no matter who one is and it contains a theme of escapism. "Vogue" has appeared in a remixed form on three of Madonna's greatest hits compilations: The Immaculate Collection (1990), Celebration (2009) and Finally Enough Love (2022).

Critically, "Vogue" has been met with appreciation ever since its release; reviewers have praised its anthemic nature and listed it as one of Madonna's career highlights. Commercially, the song remains one of Madonna's biggest international hits, topping the charts in over 30 countries, including Australia, Canada, Japan, the United Kingdom and the United States. The Recording Industry Association of America (RIAA) certified "Vogue" with double platinum, becoming the first single by a female artist earning a multiplatinum certification since the introduction of that level by the RIAA in 1984. Worldwide, it became the best-selling single of 1990, selling over six million copies.

The accompanying music video for "Vogue", directed by David Fincher, was shot in black-and-white and takes stylistic inspiration from the 1920s and 1930s. Madonna and her dancers can be seen vogueing to different choreographed moves. The video has been ranked as one of the greatest of all time in different critic lists and polls, and won three awards at the 1990 MTV Video Music Awards out of a total of nine nominations.

Madonna has performed the song on six of her world tours, at the 1990 MTV Video Music Awards and at her performance during the halftime show of Super Bowl XLVI. The song has also been featured on the soundtrack of The Devil Wears Prada (2006), as well as in "The Power of Madonna" episode of the Fox show Glee. Writers and critics have noted the video and the song's influence in bringing an underground subculture into mainstream popular culture through the postmodern nature of her power and influence, as well as the way in which it followed a new trend in which dance music enjoyed widespread popularity.

Background and recording
Producer Shep Pettibone had produced successful remixes for a number of Madonna songs and provided additional production on her singles "Like a Prayer" and "Express Yourself". Warner Music head of dance music Craig Kostich approached Pettibone with the idea of collaborating with Madonna on a new song. Pettibone recalled that "Vogue" was created quickly and cheaply; he wrote and recorded the backing track in two weeks on a budget of $5000, then submitted it to Madonna, who wrote the lyrics and conceived the title.

Madonna (who had just finished working on the Dick Tracy film and soundtrack) flew to New York and recorded her vocals in a small 24-track basement studio on West 56th St, in a booth that had been converted from a closet. According to Pettibone, Madonna was efficient in the studio, rapidly tracking all the verse and chorus vocals in order, in single takes. Pettibone proposed the idea of a rap to fill the middle eight. He suggested namechecking classic film stars, so he and Madonna quickly wrote a list of names and she recorded it immediately. Pettibone also came up with the vocal coda ("Ooooh, you've got to, let your body move to the music"). After Madonna returned to Los Angeles, Pettibone added piano and altered the bassline to fit her vocal. The finished song was submitted to Warners, three weeks after Kostich's approach.

"Vogue" was originally intended to be the B-side for "Keep It Together" (the final single from Like a Prayer), but after the completed track was presented to Warner Bros. executives, all parties involved decided that "Vogue" should be released as a single. Although the song itself had nothing to do with Dick Tracy, it was included on the album I'm Breathless, which contained songs from and inspired by the film. Madonna altered some of the suggestive lyrics because the song was connected to the Disney film via soundtrack. "Vogue" was also used in a commercial for Dick Tracy, prompting TV Guide Magazine to condemn the commercial as false advertisement.

Composition

"Vogue" is a house song with disco influence. The song has been noted by AllMusic critic Stephen Thomas Erlewine to have a "deep house groove" and to have a "throbbing beat" by Mark Coleman of Rolling Stone. The backing track also features elements of salsa-influenced soul music, including in the form of samples of horns and strings from the 1982 Salsoul Orchestra track "Ooh I Love It (Love Break)", the inclusion of which was later the subject of a lawsuit.

J. Randy Taraborrelli, in his book Madonna: An Intimate Biography, wrote that the song was a "pulsating dance track". According to sheet music published at Musicnotes.com at Alfred Publishing, the song is written in the key of A♭ major, has a tempo of 116 beats per minute, and in it, Madonna's vocal range spans from C4 to E♭5. Lyrically, the song has a theme of escapism, and talks about how any person can enjoy themself.

In the bridge, the song has a spoken rap section, in which Madonna references sixteen "Golden Age" Hollywood stars from the 1920s to the 1950s. In order of mention in the lyrics, they are Greta Garbo, Marilyn Monroe, Marlene Dietrich, Joe DiMaggio, Marlon Brando, Jimmy Dean, Grace Kelly, Jean Harlow, Gene Kelly, Fred Astaire, Ginger Rogers, Rita Hayworth, Lauren Bacall, Katharine Hepburn, Lana Turner and Bette Davis. Ten of the stars mentioned in the song (namely Davis, Dean, Dietrich, DiMaggio, Garbo, Harlow, Rogers, Turner, and both Kellys) were entitled to a royalty payment of $3,750, payable to their estates, when Madonna performed "Vogue" at the Super Bowl XLVI halftime show in 2012, as their likenesses were displayed during the performance. At the time, Bacall was the lone living star; she died in 2014, at the age of 89.

Madonna and Pettibone were sued by VMG Salsoul in June 2012 based on the accusation that they had sampled the 1976 song "Love Break" by the Salsoul Orchestra. Pettibone's defense was that he recreated the horn sound, not sampled it. The case was decided in their favor; the judge found that "no reasonable audience" would be able to discern the sampled portions, as they were insignificant to "Vogue". That decision was affirmed by the Ninth Circuit Court of Appeals.

Critical reception
"Vogue" has been lauded by critics since its release. AllMusic critic Stephen Thomas Erlewine claimed that the song was "Madonna's finest single moment" and that it had an "instantly memorable melody". In a review of The Immaculate Collection, Erlewine also claimed that the song was "sleek" and "stylish". Jose F. Promis, in another AllMusic review, claimed that "Vogue" was a "crowning artistic achievement". Bill Coleman from Billboard commented that "the starlet's pop/house homage to the underground (soon to be pushed very overground) fad pulls off its aims." He stated that it "maintains the flavor of Pettibone's past 'house' treatments with a bit of his classic 'Love Break' tossed in for good déjà vu measure." Ernest Hardy from Cashbox stated that "pop savvy takes well to a house setting", adding, "it's gonna be a Madonna Summer". Jim Farber from Entertainment Weekly, in a relatively negative review of I'm Breathless, asserted that the "finale of 'Vogue'" is "the sole bright spot". David Giles from Music Week stated that "it possesses a meatier groove than we've been used to and also a silly 'list' segment that reduces her to the level of the Beloved." In his review of I'm Breathless, Mark Coleman from Rolling Stone wrote that, whilst the song initially sounded "lackluster", within the album's context, it "gains a startling resonance". Sal Cinquemani of Slant Magazine, in his review of the album as a whole, claimed that whilst the "hugely influential" song initially sounded "grossly out of place", it turns out to be "a fitting finale" for I'm Breathless. J. Randy Taraborrelli, in his book, Madonna: An Intimate Biography, wrote that the song was a "funky, uptown anthem celebrating the art of 'voguing'", as well as that the rap section "is still one of Madonna's greatest camp musical moments".

In 2003, Madonna fans were asked to vote for their Top 20 Madonna singles of all-time by Q-Magazine. "Vogue" was allocated the number-14 spot. In 2007, VH1 ranked the song fifth on its list of Greatest Songs of the 90s. Slant Magazine placed "Vogue" at number ten on their Best Singles of the '90s list, as well as at number three in their list of the 100 Greatest Dance Songs. "Vogue", on addition, has received numerous accolades. It won the 1991 Juno Award for Best Selling International Single, as well as winning the American Music Award for Favourite Dance Single. The song, based on the 1990 Rolling Stone Reader's Poll Awards, was voted Best single. The song was also ranked as the fourth best song of 1990 on that year's Pazz & Jop poll by The Village Voice.

Commercial performance

After its release, "Vogue" reached number one in over 30 countries worldwide, becoming Madonna's biggest hit at that time. It was also the best-selling single of 1990 with sales of more than two million, and has sold more than six million copies worldwide to date. In addition, "Vogue" became up that time the highest-selling single on WEA, surpassing Chic's 1978 single, "Le Freak".

In the US, massive airplay and sales demand in response to the popular music video in April 1990 made way for "Vogue"'s number 39 debut in the week of April 14. The song shot to number one on the Billboard Hot 100 in its sixth week on the chart, dated May 19, 1990, displacing Sinéad O'Connor's four-week run in the top spot with "Nothing Compares 2 U". The song also reached number one on the Hot Dance Club Play chart, remaining there for two weeks. On June 28, 1990, "Vogue" was certified double platinum by the Recording Industry Association of America (RIAA) for sales of two million copies of the physical single across United States. "Vogue" became the first multiplatinum single by a female artist —and third overall— since the introduction of multiplatinum awards by the RIAA in 1984. To date, it remains Madonna's best-selling physical single in the country. As of 2010, "Vogue" has sold additional 311,000 digital downloads, according to Nielsen SoundScan.

"Vogue" was also a success in Europe by topping the Eurochart Hot 100 Singles chart for eight consecutive weeks. In the United Kingdom, the song knocked Snap!'s "The Power" off the number one slot and stayed there for four weeks, continuing a trend of club/pop crossovers going to number one. It was helped in the UK by multi-formatting. As well as the 7-inch, 12-inch, CD and cassette singles, the label released four limited editions: 12-inch with Face of the 80s poster, 12-inch with 'X-rated' poster and an extra remix on the B-side, 7-inch picture disc and 12-inch picture disc. According to the Official Charts Company, the song has sold 663,000 units as of April 2019. Released as a double A-side to "Keep It Together", "Vogue" also topped the Australian ARIA singles chart for five weeks.

Music video

Background

The video was directed by David Fincher and shot at the Burbank Studios in Burbank, California, on February 10–11, 1990. The video was brought together after a large casting call in Los Angeles where hundreds of different sorts of dancers appeared.

Filmed in black-and-white, the video recalls the look of films and photography from the Golden Age of Hollywood with the use of artwork by the Art Deco artist Tamara de Lempicka and an Art Deco set design. Many of the scenes are recreations of photographs taken by noted photographer Horst P. Horst, including his famous Mainbocher Corset, Lisa with Turban (1940), and Carmen Face Massage (1946). Horst was reportedly "displeased" with Madonna's video because he never gave his permission for his photographs to be used and received no acknowledgement from Madonna. Some of the close-up poses recreate noted portraits of such stars as Marilyn Monroe, Bette Davis, Veronica Lake, Greta Garbo, Marlene Dietrich, Katharine Hepburn, Judy Garland and Jean Harlow. (Additionally, several stars of this era were name-checked in the song's lyrics.) Several famous Hollywood portrait photographers whose style and works are referenced include George Hurrell, Eugene Robert Richee, Don English, Whitey Schafer, Ernest Bachrach, Scotty Welbourne, László Willinger, and Clarence Sinclair Bull.

The video features the dancers for Madonna's then-upcoming Blond Ambition World Tour – Donna De Lory, Niki Harris, Luis Xtravaganza Camacho, Jose Gutierez Xtravaganza, Salim Gauwloos, Carlton Wilborn, Gabriel Trupin, Oliver Crumes and Kevin Stea. The choreography was set by "Punk Ballerina" Karole Armitage. The video premiered worldwide on MTV on March 29, 1990, and it also premiered on BET on November 22 that same year, making it the first video by Madonna to air on an African-American channel.

There are two versions of the video, the regularly aired television music video, and the 12-inch remix, which is the extended version over three minutes longer.

Synopsis

The black-and-white video, set in Art Deco-themed 1920s and 1930s surroundings, starts off showing different sculptures, works of art, as well as Madonna's dancers posing. Along with this are images of a maid and a butler cleaning up inside what seems to be a grand house. When the dance section of the song starts, Madonna turns around, and, similarly to the lyrics, strikes a pose. The video progresses, and images of men with fedoras, Madonna wearing the controversial sheer lace dress and other outfits, follow. As the chorus begins, Madonna and her dancers start to perform a vogue dance routine, where she sings the chorus as her dancers mime the backing vocals. After this, other scenes of Madonna in different outfits and imitations of golden-era Hollywood stars progresses, after which there is a scene with Madonna's dancers voguing. Finally, after this scene, Madonna can be seen wearing her iconic "cone bra", after which she also performs a dance routine with a fellow dancer. As the rap section begins, different clips of Madonna posing in the style of famous photographs or portraits of Hollywood stars, begins, ultimately followed by a choreographed scene with her dancers and backup singers.

Reception
MTV placed the video at second on their list of 100 Greatest Music Videos Ever Made in 1999. In 1993, Rolling Stone magazine listed the video as the twenty-eighth best music video of all-time. Also, the same magazine listed "Vogue" as the number-two music video of all time in 1999 second only to Michael Jackson's Thriller. It was also ranked at number five on the Top 100 Videos That Broke The Rules, issued by MTV on the channel's 25th anniversary in August 2006. It was the third time Fincher and Madonna collaborated on a video (the first being 1989's "Express Yourself" and the second being 1989's "Oh Father"). About.com listed as the best Madonna video.

There was some controversy surrounding the video due to a scene in which Madonna's breasts and, if the viewer looks closely, her nipples could be seen through her sheer lace blouse, as seen in the picture on the right. MTV wanted to remove this scene, but Madonna refused, and the video aired with the shot intact.

"Vogue" music video received a total of nine MTV Video Music Awards nominations, becoming her most-nominated video at the award show. It won Best Direction, Best Editing and Best Cinematography. The video was voted number two on MTV's 100 Greatest Videos Ever Made.

In 2019, "Vogue" became Madonna's fourth music video to reach over 100 million views across four different decades (following "Bitch I'm Madonna", "Hung Up" and "La Isla Bonita") which made her the first female artist in history to achieve this feat within the streaming era.

Live performances

The song was performed on most of her tours and featured extensively on her live albums across the decades, including the Blond Ambition World Tour, Girlie Show Tour, Re-Invention World Tour, the Sticky & Sweet Tour, the Super Bowl XLVI halftime show, The MDNA Tour, Rebel Heart Tour, and Madame X Tour.

On April 13 1990, Vogue debuted during the Blond Ambition World Tour in Japan, as part of the Dick Tracy segment of the show. The performance featured various cutouts of Tamara de Lempicka's paintings as backdrops, with the singer and the dancers wearing black spandex and doing the original choreography from the music video. On September 6, 1990, a month after the end of the Blond Ambition World Tour, Madonna made her now-famous appearance at the 1990 MTV Video Music Awards, lip-synching to "Vogue" with backing vocalists Donna De Lory and Niki Haris and Madonna's male dancers. The performance was repeated the following night at the AIDS Project Los Angeles' fourth annual Commitment To Life benefit at the Wiltern Theater, where Madonna was honored with an award. Writer Carol Clerk has suggested that Madonna bore "great resemblance to Marie Antoinette". In a 2015 interview former Madonna dancers Luis Camacho and Jose Gutierez explained that the inspiration for theme in fact came from the 1988 film Dangerous Liaisons. Prior to the VMA performance, Madonna was uncertain whether she should perform "Vogue" or "Keep It Together", but just before the end of the concert tour, during a game of charades with her troupe, Madonna realized the connection between the "arrogant and aristocratic" attitudes and mannerisms of vogueing, and those of the characters in Dangerous Liaisons, so she arranged for the troupe to be dressed in appropriate 18th-century-styled costumes, and Madonna herself performed in one of the lavish gowns that Glenn Close had worn in the film. Camacho also recalled that the troupe was very nervous about their performance, because part of the routine called for Madonna and her singers to throw their fans in the air and catch them, but they kept dropping them in rehearsals. However, on the night, the move went off flawlessly, and Camacho said that the dancers were so relieved that they spontaneously applauded them. During the performance, Madonna and her dancers flashed their undergarments during their routine, at one point Madonna pushed the faces of two male dancers into her breasts, one of her dancers also fondled her breasts, and another briefly put his head under Madonna's skirts. Overall, the performance was ranked as the second best in the history of MTV Video Music Awards in a 2014 Billboard poll. In 2022, the staff of Billboard ranked at number one this performance in their "22 Best VMAs Performances of All Time".

On 25 September 1993, Vogue was the third song, as part of Girlie Show Tour, as part of the Dominatrix section. The performance featured Madonna wearing an elaborate Asian beaded headdress and engaging in a Thai-inspired choreography. The song made its debut almost a decade later on the Reinvention Tour, as part of the Marie Antoinette segment of the show. It began with "The Beast Within"; an ominous reading from the Book of Revelation was done by Madonna while the screens flashed images and footage from X-STaTIC PRO=CeSS. As the video ended, the singer emerged on a rising platform, wearing the Lacroix corset and striking yoga poses to perform the song. On the Sticky and Sweet Tour, Vogue and "4 Minutes" were remixed together, as part of the Pimp segment of the show. Madonna wore a see through shirt, a black bra, underwear and tall boots. Her dancers were dressed in skin colour and black lace lingerie-inspired body suits. 

The song was featured during the Super Bowl XLVI halftime show, which was broadcast on NBC on February 5, 2012. It began as a procession to the stage, with men dressed as gladiators pulling a large structure hidden from view by large gold-colored flags. As "Vogue" began the flags were removed, revealing Madonna in a long, gold-colored cape and an ancient-Egyptian helmet seated on a large throne. The procession reached the stage, and the singer began performing "Vogue". During the chorus, the stadium floor lit up to reveal animated Vogue magazine covers featuring Madonna. The stage used multimedia projection and technology conceived by Moment Factory and Cirque du Soleil. The magazine effect was achieved by projection mapping, which turns an object (often irregularly-shaped) into a surface for video projection. Although projection mapping had been used to introduce the Nokia Lumia and project images of NBA players on the Hudson River in 2011, it had never been used on such a large scale. A remixed interlude of "Justify My Love" began the Masculine/Feminine act of the MDNA Tour; the black-and-white video showed Madonna running away from masked dancers and locking herself inside a room. The performance of Vogue followed on and saw her wearing the re-worked Gaultier conical corset while the dancers wore black-and-white avant-garde outfits. Backdrops of the Empire State Building were projected on the screen and flashing lights, and clicking sounds to that of a paparazzi camera were incorporated into the performance.

In 2015, Vogue was performed on the Rebel Heart Tour. During "Holy Water", the female dancers were dressed as nuns and danced on 20-feet cross-like poles; halfway through the performance, Madonna climbed onto one of the poles and sang a fragment of "Vogue". She then performed the rest of "Holy Water" with pictures of the Apostles on the video screens, followed by a reenactment of the Last Supper. This was the penultimate song under Joan of Arc/Samurai segment of the show. On June 30 2019, Madonna performed Vogue during her mini concert for Stonewall 50 – WorldPride NYC 2019 at Pier 97, Hudson River Park, New York City. The performance featured Madonna and look-a-like dancers, dressed in sunglasses, high-heels and large trench coats walking up a set of stairs and dancing using fans. For this performance, Madonna wore her famous Madame X eyepatch, which featured a rainbow coloured X on it. Madonna extracted this performance and incorporated it into her Madame X  Tour. At the end of the performance, she bangs her knuckles on a type-writer as the dancers leave the stage, with echoing sounds of her declaring her Madame X persona.

Cover versions

In 1992, Finnish progressive metal band Waltari recorded a cover version for their album Torcha!, which became a single and has a video clip. In 1998, Britney Spears added the song to the setlist of her ...Baby One More Time Tour, along with Madonna's "Material Girl". "Vogue" was featured in the 2006 film The Devil Wears Prada and appears as the opening track of its soundtrack album. Australian singer Kylie Minogue used the song in both her Homecoming Tour and For You, For Me Tour, as a mashup with her own song "Burning Up". In 2008, Rihanna performed the song during the Fashion Rocks show. In 2014, the studio version of the recording leaked online.

On the Fox TV show Glee, Sue Sylvester (Jane Lynch) sang and performed in a "Vogue" music video on the March 2010 all-Madonna episode, with the name of Ginger Rogers replaced by the name of Sue Sylvester, and the phrase "Bette Davis, we love you" replaced by the phrase "Will Schuester, I hate you". The song charted at number 106 on the UK Singles Chart. Beth Ditto included "Vogue" in several live performances, including at Moscow Miller Party. She also paid homage to "Vogue" with the video of her single "I Wrote the Book". In 2014, Katy Perry used a snippet of "Vogue" and mashed it with her own song "International Smile", during The Prismatic World Tour. In 2015, Ariana Grande performed a mashup of "Vogue" and Chaka Khan's "I'm Every Woman" during the third leg of The Honeymoon Tour.

In August 2022, American singer Beyoncé teamed up with Madonna for "The Queens Remix" of her single, "Break My Soul". The remix heavily interpolates "Vogue", and pays homage to iconic Black women in music. Few days after the release, Beyoncé thanked Madonna for allowing her to use the song, and she also revealed that Madonna was the one that named the remix. On August 5, Beyoncé released the remix exclusively through her online store, before releasing it to streaming services; It features Beyoncé namedropping Rosetta Tharpe, Santigold, Bessie Smith, Nina Simone, Betty Davis, Solange Knowles, Erykah Badu, Lizzo, Kelly Rowland, Lauryn Hill, Roberta Flack, Toni Braxton, Janet Jackson, Tierra Whack, Missy Elliott, Diana Ross, Grace Jones, Aretha Franklin, Anita Baker, Sade, Jill Scott, Michelle Williams, Chlöe, Halle Bailey, Aaliyah, Alicia Keys, Whitney Houston, Rihanna and Nicki Minaj, before naming legendary ballroom houses such as House of Xtravaganza, House of Aviance and House of LaBeija, as a celebration of Black people empowerment within the industry.

Legacy

"Vogue" was included on the Rock and Roll Hall of Fame's "500 Songs That Shaped Rock and Roll", and was voted number five on VH1's 100 Greatest Songs of the 90s. Time called it "the most famous fashion song of all time", although the song was not specifically about the [Vogue] magazine. Author Lucy O'Brien, in her book Madonna: Like an Icon, wrote a detailed description of the song's influence:

With the release of the song, Madonna brought the underground "vogueing" into mainstream culture. CNN correspondent, Scottie Andrew commented that "Vogue" marked one of the first mainstream pop culture works to spotlight elements from the queer, Black and Latino-led ballroom scene. Before Madonna popularized the dance, vogue was performed mostly in bars and disco of New York City on the underground gay scene. Steven Canals, the co-creator of TV series Pose stated "If we're looking at the history of ballroom and specifically that moment in time, what Madonna did was bring ballroom to the mainstream. She introduced the world to this community who, up until that point in time, had been a subculture." Vogueing has since become a prominent dance form practised worldwide, and many performers have followed Madonna's footsteps, with Beyoncé, Rihanna, Ariana Grande and Azealia Banks all adopting the dance style and incorporating it into their music videos and performances. South Korean singer Luna's song "Madonna" (2021) referenced "Vogue" on its lyrics, "When I grow up, I wanna be like Madonna / When I grow up, I wanna vogue how I wanna".

The song was placed by Billboard on the number four spot on its list of "60 Top LGBTQ Anthems of All Time."

The song is also noted for bringing house music into mainstream popular music, as well as for reviving disco music after a decade of its commercial death. Erick Henderson of Slant Magazine explained that the song "was instrumental in allowing disco revivalism to emerge, allowing the denigrated gay genre to soar once again within the context of house music, the genre disco became in its second life." Sal Cinquemani of the same publication wrote that the song was "making its impact all the more impressive (it would go on to inspire a glut of pop-house copycats) and begging the question: If disco died a decade earlier, what the fuck was this big, gay, fuscia drag-queen boa of a dance song sitting on top of the charts for a month for?"

"Vogue" has inspired flash mobs around the US. In 2015, the rhythmic gymnastics group from Ukraine used the track for their 6 clubs and 2 hoops routine, which was intended to be shown at the 2016 Summer Olympics in Rio. In 2021, Rolling Stone listed "Vogue" as one of the "500 Best Songs of All Time", at number 139, while in 2022 they named it the 11th greatest dance song of all time. An August 2022 Financial Times article discussed how the song helped bring Latinx, LGBT, and drag subcultures into the mainstream. In September 2022, Pichfork ranked "Vogue" as the 115th best song of the 1990's, praising it for how unapologetically it celebrated queer life at the height of the AIDS epidemic. Music critic Jody Rosen from Slate, included "Vogue" as one of Madonna's "ten essential songs for new or aspiring fans".

Track listing

US 7-inch and cassette single; Japanese 3-inch CD single
 "Vogue" (single version) – 4:19
 "Vogue" (Bette Davis dub) – 7:26

UK and European 7-inch and cassette single
 "Vogue" (single version) – 4:19
 "Keep It Together" (single remix) – 4:31

US CD maxi-single and digital single
 "Vogue" (single version) – 4:19
 "Vogue" (12-inch version) – 8:25
 "Vogue" (Bette Davis dub) – 7:26
 "Vogue" (Strike-A-Pose dub) – 7:36

US 12-inch maxi-single
 "Vogue" (12-inch version) – 8:25
 "Vogue" (Bette Davis dub) – 7:26
 "Vogue" (Strike-A-Pose dub) – 7:36

UK and European 12-inch and CD single
 "Vogue" (12-inch version) – 8:25
 "Keep It Together" (12-inch remix) – 7:50

UK 12-inch and CD single
 "Vogue" (12-inch version) – 8:25
 "Vogue" (Strike-A-Pose dub) – 7:36

Japanese CD EP
 "Vogue" (12-inch version) – 8:25
 "Vogue" (Bette Davis dub) – 7:26
 "Vogue" (Strike-A-Pose dub) – 7:36
 "Hanky Panky" (Bare Bottom 12-inch mix) – 6:36
 "Hanky Panky" (Bare Bones single mix) – 3:52
 "More" (album version) – 4:58

Charts

Weekly charts

Year-end charts

Decade-end charts

All-time charts

Certifications and sales

!scope="col" colspan="3"| Digital
|-

See also

 List of Australian chart achievements and milestones
 List of number-one singles in Australia during the 1990s
 List of Billboard Hot 100 number ones of 1990
 List of Cash Box Top 100 number-one singles of 1990
 List of European number-one airplay songs of the 1990s
 List of UK Singles Chart number ones of the 1990s
 Novelty and fad dances

References

Book sources

Further reading

External links
 
 Through the Years: Madonna's "Vogue" at 25 at Slant Magazine

1990 singles
1990 songs
Billboard Hot 100 number-one singles
Black-and-white music videos
Cashbox number-one singles
European Hot 100 Singles number-one singles
Dance-pop songs
House music songs
LGBT-related songs
List songs
Madonna songs
MTV Video Music Award for Best Direction
Music videos directed by David Fincher
Number-one singles in Australia
Number-one singles in Finland
Number-one singles in Greece
Number-one singles in Italy
Number-one singles in New Zealand
Number-one singles in Norway
Number-one singles in Portugal
Number-one singles in Spain
Number-one singles in Sweden
Number-one singles in Switzerland
Oricon International Singles Chart number-one singles
RPM Top Singles number-one singles
Sampling controversies
Sire Records singles
Warner Records singles
Song recordings produced by Madonna
Song recordings produced by Shep Pettibone
Songs about actors
Songs about dancing
Songs about Marilyn Monroe
Songs written by Madonna
Songs written by Shep Pettibone
UK Singles Chart number-one singles
Songs written for films